Beef brains and veal (juvenile beef) or calf's brains are used in the cuisines of France; Italy; Spain; El Salvador; Mexico, etc. where they are called sesos in Spanish and are eaten in tacos and quesadillas; Pakistan and Bangladesh, where they are known in Urdu and Bengali as Maghaz; Portugal; and Indonesia.

Calf's brains, or cervelle de veau, is a traditional delicacy in Europe and Morocco. It is the brain of a calf consumed as meat. It is often served with tongue, sauteed with beurre noir and capers,  or mixed with scrambled eggs.
In Italy, cervella fritte is a popular dish made of bite-sized batter-fried morsels of beef brain. Beef brains have a mushy texture and very little inherent flavor and are typically flavored with sauces such as chile sauce and sauce ravigote. 

Outbreaks of bovine spongiform encephalopathy (BSE, commonly known as mad-cow disease) led to legislation to reduce risks of contracting the human variant of the illness by consumption of beef brains and spines.

See also

 Brain (as food)
 Cabeza
 Eggs and brains
 Fried-brain sandwich
 Maghaz
 Phospho-Energon

References

Beef
Brain dishes
French cuisine
Indonesian cuisine
Italian cuisine
Meat processing in France
Mexican cuisine
Offal
Spanish cuisine